Gunblade may refer to:
A fictional weapon from the Final Fantasy video game series.
Pistol sword, a rare type of combination weapon in use from the 17th until the 19th centuries.
Gunblade NY, a 1995 Sega arcade machine.